Hardinge Stanley Giffard, 1st Earl of Halsbury, PC QC later KC (3 September 1823 – 11 December 1921) was a British lawyer and Conservative politician. He served three times as Lord High Chancellor of Great Britain, for a total of seventeen years.

Early life and career
Born in Pentonville, London, Giffard was the third son of Stanley Lees Giffard, editor of the London Evening Standard, by his wife Susanna, daughter of Francis Moran, Downhill, Ballina, County Mayo. Hardinge attended Merton College, Oxford. His mother died when he was five, and his father married his cousin, Mary Anne Giffard. He was educated by his father at home, before entering Merton College, Oxford, where he obtained a fourth-class degree in literae humaniores in 1845. Between 1845 and 1848, he helped his father edit the Standard.

Having entered the Inner Temple as a student in 1848, he was called to the bar there in 1850. Giffard joined the Westen, then the South Wales circuits. Afterwards he had a large practice at the Central Criminal Court and the Middlesex sessions, and he was for several years junior prosecuting counsel to the Treasury, and working treasurer in 1881. He was engaged in most of the celebrated trials of his time, including the Overend and Gurney and the Tichborne cases. He became Queen's Counsel in 1865, and a bencher of the Inner Temple.

Between 1883-1919, he had been the constable of Launceston Castle, he was appointed by Edward VII, Duke of Cornwall.

Political career
Giffard twice contested Cardiff for the Conservatives in 1868 and 1874, but he was still without a seat in the House of Commons when he was appointed Solicitor General by Disraeli in 1875 and received the customary knighthood. He also failed to gain a seat in a by-election in Horsham in 1876. In 1877 he succeeded in obtaining a seat, when he was returned for Launceston, which he continued to represent until his elevation to the peerage.

In 1885, Giffard was appointed Lord High Chancellor of Great Britain in Lord Salisbury's first administration, and was created Baron Halsbury, of Halsbury in the County of Devon, thus forming a remarkable exception to the rule that no criminal lawyer could ever reach the woolsack. He resumed the position in 1886 and held it until 1892 and again from 1895 to 1905, his tenure of the office, broken only by the brief Liberal ministries of 1886 and 1892–1895, being longer than that of any Lord Chancellor since Lord Eldon. In 1898 he was created Earl of Halsbury and Viscount Tiverton, of Tiverton, Devon.

Halsbury was an opponent of the British trade union movement and used his position to appoint anti-union justices in the judicial system, leading to decisions such as Taff Vale Rly Co v Amalgamated Society of Rly Servants and Quinn v Leathem which restricted the unions' right to strike. The legal threats to trade unions at this time drove them to form the Labour Party to seek parliamentary representation.

During the crisis over the Parliament Act 1911, Halsbury was one of the principal leaders of the rebel faction of Tory peers—labelled the "Ditchers"—that resolved on all out opposition to the government's bill limiting the House of Lords' veto whatever happened. At a meeting of Conservative peers on 21 July of that year, Halsbury shouted out "I will divide even if I am alone". As Halsbury left the meeting a reporter asked him what was going to happen. Halsbury immediately replied: "Government by a Cabinet controlled by rank socialists". Halsbury was also President of the Royal Society of Literature, Grand Warden of English Freemasons, and High Steward of the University of Oxford, and warden of guild of undergraduates in University of Birmingham. He also became the chairman of guilds in the London institute, president of royal society of literature in 1911-12.

Halsbury's lasting legacy was the compilation of a complete digest of "Halsbury's Laws of England" (1907-1917), a major reference work published in many volumes and often called simply "Halsbury's". "Halsbury's Laws" was followed by a second multiple-volume reference work in 1929, "Halsbury's Statutes", and later by "Halsbury's Statutory Instruments".

Family
Halsbury married firstly Caroline, daughter of William Corne Humphreys, in 1852. There were no children from this marriage. Caroline died in September 1873. Halsbury married secondly Wilhelmina, daughter of Henry Woodfall, in 1874. He died in December 1921, aged 98, and was succeeded by his only son from his second marriage, Hardinge. The Countess of Halsbury died in December 1927.

Judgments
Among cases in which Halsbury delivered judgment are:

Salomon v Salomon
Mogul Steamship Co Ltd v McGregor, Gow & Co [1892] AC 25
British South Africa Co v Companhia de Moçambique [1893] AC 602 - the House of Lords overturned a Court of Appeal decision and by so doing established the Mozambique rule, a common law rule in private international law that renders actions relating to title in foreign land, the right to possession of foreign land, and trespass to foreign land non-justiciable in common law jurisdictions.
Bray v Ford [1896] AC 44
Taff Vale Railway Co v Amalgamated Society of Railway Servants [1901] AC 426
Daimler Co Ltd v Continental Tyre and Rubber Co (Great Britain) Ltd [1916] 2 AC 307

References

Sources

External links

 
 

Halsbury, Hardinge Giffard, 1st Earl of
Halsbury, Hardinge Giffard, 1st Earl of
Halsbury, Hardinge Giffard, 1st Earl of
Halsbury,
Halsbury, Hardinge Giffard, 1st Earl of
Halsbury, Hardinge Giffard, 1st Earl of
UK MPs 1874–1880
UK MPs 1880–1885
UK MPs who were granted peerages
Politicians from Cornwall
Solicitors General for England and Wales
Members of the Judicial Committee of the Privy Council
Members of the Parliament of the United Kingdom for Launceston
Fellows of the Royal Society
Presidents of the Royal Society of Literature
Alumni of Merton College, Oxford
Members of the Privy Council of the United Kingdom
Conservative Party (UK) MPs for English constituencies
Contributors to Halsbury's Laws of England
Halsbury, Giffard, Hardinge 1st Earl of
Lawyers from London
Presidents of the Classical Association